Iván Gabriel Maggi (born 14 June 1999) is an Argentine professional footballer who plays as a forward for San Martín de Tucumán, on loan from Racing Club.

Professional career
Maggi joined the youth academy of Racing Club in 2012, and signed his first professional contract with them on 17 October 2020. Maggi made his professional debut with Racing Club in a 1-1 Argentine Primera División tie with Defensa y Justicia on 29 November 2019. In January 2022, Maggi joined Primera Nacional club San Martín de Tucumán on a one-year loan deal.

References

External links
 
 BDFA Profile 

1999 births
Living people
Sportspeople from Lanús
Argentine people of Italian descent
Argentine footballers
Association football forwards
Racing Club de Avellaneda footballers
San Martín de Tucumán footballers
Argentine Primera División players
Primera Nacional players